Avfall Sverige is the Swedish Waste Management recycling association.

References

Recycling
Business organizations based in Sweden